Alexandra Davies (born 8 March 1977) is an English-born Australian actress.

Biography

She attended Castle Hill High school from 1989 to 1994

Davies graduated from the University of Western Sydney with a Bachelor of Arts in Performance

In her breakthrough role, Davies played Donna Parry in the Australian police drama Young Lions in 2002. She was a Most Popular New Female Talent nominee at the 2003 Logie Awards.

Davies also starred in the sitcom Flat Chat and has made guest appearances on Water Rats, McLeod's Daughters and The Secret Life of Us.

In 2005 she also had a very brief role in the film Stealth.

Since 2004 Davies has portrayed character Cate McMasters in the medical drama All Saints. She previously appeared in two early episodes of the show as a woman with whom previous character Ben Markham had a fling.

Personal life 
Davies married to Justin "Jay" Hanrahan, a cameraman she met while on All Saints, in January 2008. The couple give a birth to a son. In 2016 they separated and filed divorce on 20 March 2017 by the Los Angeles County Superior Court.

External links

Official Website: https://web.archive.org/web/20080402082247/http://www.alexdavies.com.au/

1977 births
Australian television actresses
Living people
Western Sydney University alumni
English emigrants to Australia
Actresses from Newcastle upon Tyne